The World to Come is a 2020 American drama film directed by Mona Fastvold, from a screenplay by Ron Hansen and Jim Shepard, based upon Shepard's story of the same name. It stars Katherine Waterston, Vanessa Kirby, Christopher Abbott and Casey Affleck, and follows two neighboring couples battling hardship and isolation in mid-19th century America.

It had its world premiere at the 77th Venice International Film Festival on September 6, 2020, where it won the Queer Lion award for best LGBTQ-themed film at the festival. It was released in a limited release on February 12, 2021, followed by video on demand on March 2, 2021, by Bleecker Street.

Plot
In 1856 in Schoharie County, Abigail and Dyer live an isolated life in the country working as farmers. They are both devastated by the recent loss of their young daughter Nellie.

A new similarly childless couple moves in beside them. Abigail is immediately entranced by Tallie, the wife, and the two women form a quick and deep friendship. Abigail confides to Tallie that her marriage with Dyer is based on practicality, not romance while Tallie reveals that her husband Finney can be quarrelsome and controlling.

For Abigail's birthday Tallie buys her an atlas that she had longed for. When Tallie is returning home from the birthday visit she is caught in a storm that nearly kills her. Her husband takes her away to recuperate, and when she returns it is spring and Tallie resumes her visits to Abigail.

Eventually Tallie reveals to Abigail that she only dreams of being with her. Abigail feels similarly and the two kiss. They begin a sexual affair. Dyer, who has become increasingly emotional since their child's death, is upset of the time that Abigail spends with Tallie. Tallie's husband becomes similarly jealous of the hours she is spending away from him. Abigail expresses concern about Finney telling Tallie of many husbands poisoning their wives in the county.

Finney eventually asks Abigail and Dyer to dinner where he uncomfortably brings up their lost child and Abigail notices bruises on Tallie's neck. Finney tells a morbid  story about holding his disobedient dog outside until it froze to death. Afterwards Tallie doesn't visit for a week. Abigail finally goes in search of her and finds her rented house empty with only a bloody kerchief left behind. Though she suspects foul play, she eventually receives a letter from Tallie informing her she has moved 85 miles away to the Skaneateles area of Onondaga County.

Abigail insists on going to see Tallie and Dyer reluctantly complies. However by the time they arrive Tallie is dead.    Finney claims it is from diphtheria, but a flashback reveals Finney holding and dancing with Tallie until she collapsed.

Abigail returns to her life on the farm. She and Dyer continue to work together but are still emotionally estranged. To comfort herself, Abigail imagines murdering Finney one day and tries to picture Nellie and Tallie comforting one another in the afterlife.  When Dyer asks her to imagine anything she can do to ease their longing, Abigail begins to imagine Tallie in his place.

Cast
Katherine Waterston as Abigail
Vanessa Kirby as Tallie
Christopher Abbott as Finney
Casey Affleck as Dyer

Production
It was announced in February 2019 that Casey Affleck would produce and star in the film, with Mona Fastvold directing. Katherine Waterston, Vanessa Kirby and Jesse Plemons were also cast in the film, although Plemons dropped out and was later replaced with Christopher Abbott.

Principal photography began in September 2019.

Music
British composer Daniel Blumberg was commissioned to compose music for the film. He collaborated with avant-garde musicians including Peter Brötzmann, Josephine Foster and Steve Noble on the score, and enlisted Scott Walker producer Peter Walsh to co-produce.

Release
The film had its world premiere in competition at the Venice Film Festival on September 6, 2020. Shortly after, Bleecker Street acquired U.S. distribution rights to the film. Sony Pictures Worldwide Acquisitions will distribute the film outside the United States.  It was released in a limited release on February 12, 2021, followed by video on demand on March 2, 2021. On 6 March 2022, it began showing on Sky Cinema Premiere in the United Kingdom.

Critical reception
The website's critics consensus reads: "The World to Come is made from ingredients that will be familiar to fans of period forbidden romance movies, but they're given fresh life thanks to an excellent cast." On Metacritic, the film holds a rating of 73 out of 100, based on 26 critics, indicating "generally positive reviews".

References

External links
 
 
 

2020 films
American drama films
Killer Films films
Lesbian-related films
Films set in 1856
American LGBT-related films
LGBT-related romantic drama films
2020 drama films
Bleecker Street films
2020 LGBT-related films
2020s English-language films
2020s American films
2020 independent films